The river prinia (Prinia fluviatilis) is a species of bird of the family Cisticolidae. It is found in northwestern Senegal, along the Niger River (near the border between Mali and Niger), in the Lake Chad region and in northwestern Kenya. Its natural habitats are subtropical or tropical moist shrubland and swamps.

References

river prinia
Birds of West Africa
Fauna of Kenya
Lake Chad
river prinia
Taxonomy articles created by Polbot